Rata Blanca ("White Rat" in English) is an Argentine heavy metal band, formed in 1986.

History

Beginnings 

The guitarist Walter Giardino replaced Osvaldo Civile in V8 for a little time, and left the band when his songs were rejected. His friend Roberto Cosseddu, bassist of Kamikaze, helped him to record a demo tape with those songs. The drummer Gustavo Rowek, who had also left V8 a short time before, declined his projects with Civile and joined Giardino. The session musicians Rodolfo Cava (singer) and Yulie Ruth (bass player) completed the line-up that recorded the demo. The songs were "Chico callejero", "Rompe el hechizo", "Gente del sur" and "La bruja blanca". Seeking stable members, the band took Saúl Blanch as singer, who was working in the hard rock band Plus. They met the bass player Guillermo Sánchez with the help of Giardino's friend Sergio Berdichevsky, member of WC at that point.

Rata Blanca made their first concert on 15 August 1987 in the Luz y Fuerza theater. Saúl Blanch left the band, and he was replaced by Carlos Périgo, who composed the song "Días Duros". Périgo left the band soon after that. Rodolfo Cava returned for a brief time, and Shito Molina got ill and could not sing anymore. As the band was about to record their first album and needed a singer immediately, Saúl Blanch returned to the band and helped record it. The album Rata Blanca was released in 1988, with nine songs. On that year they took part in the "Halley en Obras" concert, along with Alakrán, JAF and Kamikaze.

Success 
Polygram requested that the band could create an album which would have high sales in the first semester to renew the contract, and the band made fourfold the required number of sales. The keyboard player Hugo Bistolfi joined the band in 1989, and the singer Adrián Barilari replaced Saúl Blanch. The band subsequently made their second album Magos, espadas y rosas, which contained the popular songs "Mujer amante" and "La leyenda del hada y el mago". It was a successful release, and in its wake the band appeared in the TV show Ritmo de la Noche, and played in cumbia concert halls because typical rock venues could not accommodate their large audiences.

The album was followed by "Guerrero del Arco Iris", and a concert at the José Amalfitani Stadium. The band ended their contract with Polygram recording a live album, made at the Opera Theater with an orchestra, but this album was released years later. Once in BMG they made an EP called "El Libro Oculto". This work was more aggressive, both in instrumental style and lyrical style, as a result of the criticism from heavy metal fans towards the band.

Changes in lineup and reunion 
Barilari did not like the new style found in "El Libro Oculto" and left the band after a concert in Obras. Bistolfi followed him, and both of them created the band Alianza.

Barilari and Bistolfi were replaced by Mario Ian on vocals and Javier Retamozo on keyboards. With this line-up they released Entre el Cielo y el Infierno ("Between Heaven and Hell"). Later that year, they were invited to play in the "Festival Monsters of Rock" in São Paulo, Brazil, along with Ozzy Osbourne, Therapy?, and Alice Cooper. They released another album with new singer Gabriel Marian called "Rata Blanca VII". The group disbanded in late 1997. Gustavo Rowek and Sergio Berdichevsky created the band Nativo, and Giardino continued with Walter Giardino Temple.

Barilari and Bistolfi were invited to a concert of Walter Giardino Temple in 2000, which led to a reunion of the band. Rowek and Berdichevsky refused to be part of the reunion. The radio station La Mega aired frequently the old "Mujer amante" song, generating a renewed interest in the band. The new album, El camino del fuego, released in 2002, was a huge success. Its follow-up, the 2005 album La Llave de la Puerta Secreta had great sales and went into Gold even before being officially released.

Rata Blanca played with famous member of Deep Purple Glenn Hughes as a guest at the Gran Rex Theater, in 2003. They played the band's hits as well as Deep Purple's classic songs. In order to gain a more international profile, Giardino approached former Rainbow singer Doogie White to record an English version of the Forgotten Kingdom album in 2009.

2010–present 
Early in 2010, Rata Blanca historical keyboardist Hugo Bistolfi left the band and was replaced by Danilo Moschen, a former member of Barilari's soloist band.

In 2013, original members Gustavo Rowek, Sergio Berdichevsky and Saul Blanch reunited with Rata Blanca for some presentations. In 2015 Rata Blanca released their tenth studio album, Tormenta Eléctrica.

In May 2017, bassplayer Guillermo Sánchez died due to sepsis. A few days before, singer Adrián Barilari announced that Guillermo was in poor health condition.

Personnel

Current lineup 
 Walter Giardino – lead guitar (1986–1997, 2000–present)
 Adrián Barilari – vocals (1989–1993, 2000–present)
 Fernando Scarcella – drums (2000–present)
 Danilo Moschen – keyboards (2010–present)
 Pablo Motyczak – bass (2017–present)

Past members 
 Saúl Blanch – vocals (1987–1989)
 Mario Ian – vocals (1993–1996)
 Gabriel Marian – vocals (1996–1997)
 Sergio Berdichevsky – rhythm guitar (1986–1997)
 Guillermo Sánchez – bass (1986–1997, 2000–2017; died 2017)
 Gustavo Rowek – drums (1986–1997)
 Hugo Bistolfi – keyboards (1989–1993, 2000–2010)
 Javier Retamozo – keyboards (1993–1997)

Live members 
 Shito Molina – vocals (1988; died 2003)
 Carlos Perigo – vocals (1988)
 Lowi Novello – vocals (1988)
 Rodolfo Cava – vocals (1986)
 Alejandro Zon – drums (2005)
 Mariano Elias Martin – drums (2018)

Timeline

Discography

Studio albums 
 Rata Blanca (1988)
 Magos, Espadas y Rosas (1990)
 Guerrero del Arco Iris (1991)
 Entre el Cielo y el Infierno (1994)
 Rata Blanca VII (1997)
 El Camino del Fuego (2002)
 La Llave de la Puerta Secreta (2005)
 El Reino Olvidado (2008)
 Tormenta Eléctrica (2015)

Live and compilation albums 
 En Vivo en Buenos Aires (1996)
 Grandes Canciones (compilation, 2000)
 Oro: Grandes Éxitos (compilation, 2002)
 Poder Vivo (2003)
 En Vivo (2003)
 Magos Espadas y Rosas: XX Aniversario en Vivo (2011)

Singles and EPs 
 El Sueño de la Gitana (1988)
 La Leyenda del Hada y el Mago (1990)
 Días Duros (1990)
 Mujer Amante (1990)
 Abrazando el Rock & Roll (1991)
 Guerrero del Arco Iris (1991)
 Nada Es Fácil Sin tu Amor (1991)
 El Libro Oculto (EP, 1993)
 Basura (1994)
 Mujer Amante - versión acústica (2000)
 Rata Blanca (EP, 2001)
 Teatro Gran Rex XIV - XII - MMI (2001)
 Highway on Fire (EP, 2002)
 Volviendo a Casa (2002)
 El Reino Olvidado (2008)
 La Leyenda del Hada y el Mago / Mujer Amante (live, 2011)

Cover versions 
Spain's Mägo de Oz recorded a version of "Mujer amante".

References

External links 

 Official website

Argentine heavy metal musical groups
Power metal musical groups
Musical groups established in 1986
1986 establishments in Argentina